Krasikov, or Krasikova (feminine; Красикова), is a Russian surname. Notable people with the surname include:

Anatoly Krasikov (born 1931), Russian political scientist and journalist
Mikhail Krasikov (born 1959), Ukrainian poet
Pyotr Krasikov (1870–1939), Russian politician
Vassili Krassikov (1911–1965; after 1936 Vello Kaaristo), Estonian cross-country skier

See also
Krasíkov (Ústí nad Orlicí District), village and municipality in the Czech Republic

Russian-language surnames